Goldwater's Department Store was a department store chain based in Phoenix, Arizona.

History
Michael Goldwater, the grandfather of U.S. Senator and 1964 presidential candidate Barry Goldwater, established a trading post in 1860 in Gila City, Arizona Territory. In 1872, he moved to Phoenix.

Associated Dry Goods Corp. acquired Goldwater's in 1963 and expanded it to nine stores in the following decades, establishing stores  in Tucson, Albuquerque, New Mexico Albuquerque and Las Vegas markets.  In 1986, May Department Stores acquired Associated and in 1989 it dissolved the Goldwater's division.  Seven of its stores were rebranded as parts of the J. W. Robinson's, May Company California and May D&F divisions.  At this time, May sold the Tucson stores to Dillard's because of overlap with its recently acquired Foley's unit.  May Department Stores merged its May Company California and J. W. Robinson's divisions in 1993 as Robinsons-May, reuniting the Phoenix and Las Vegas stores under one nameplate while the May Department Stores unit in New Mexico became Foley's.  Following the Federated Department Stores purchase of May in 2006, several of the remaining former Goldwater's locations became Macy's, while the former flagship location at Scottsdale Fashion Square was demolished to make way for Barneys New York, which itself closed in 2016.

The Goldwater family reclaimed the store's old logo in 1989 and reincarnated it as a food company called Goldwater's Foods and now headed by Goldwater's granddaughter Carolyn Goldwater Ross.

Locations 
Goldwater's locations included

 Noble Building, Phoenix (opened 1910)
 Cortez & Union Streets, Prescott (opened September 18, 1937)
 Park Central Mall, Phoenix (opened November 8, 1956)
 Scottsdale Fashion Square, Scottsdale (opened October 9, 1961)
 Metrocenter Mall, Phoenix (opened October 21, 1973)
 Coronado Center, Albuquerque (opened February 16, 1976)
 El Con Center, Tucson (opened August 14, 1978)
 Fiesta Mall, Mesa (opened August 13, 1979)
 Paradise Valley Mall, Phoenix (opened August 11, 1980)
 Fashion Show Mall, Las Vegas (opened 1981)
 Foothills Mall, Tucson (opened 1982)

See also
List of defunct department stores of the United States

References

Further reading
Edwards, Lee. (1995) Goldwater: The Man Who Made a Revolution, Washington, D.C.: Regnery Publishing, Inc.  .
Goldberg, Robert A. (1997) Barry Goldwater, New Haven, Connecticut: Yale University Press. .
Hess, Karl (1967) In a cause that will triumph: the Goldwater campaign and the future of Conservatism, New York: Doubleday.
Kessel, John H. (1968) The Goldwater Coalition: Republican Strategies in 1964, New York: Bobbs-Merrill. ISBN N/A.

External links
Goldwater Foods

Defunct department stores based in Arizona
Defunct companies based in Arizona
Companies based in Phoenix, Arizona
Retail companies established in 1860
Retail companies disestablished in 1989
1860 establishments in New Mexico Territory
1989 disestablishments in Arizona
Jews and Judaism in Phoenix, Arizona